The Rancholabrean North American Land Mammal Age on the geologic timescale is the North American  faunal stage according to the North American Land Mammal Ages chronology (NALMA), typically set from less than 240,000 years to 11,000 years BP, a period of  . Named after the famed Rancho La Brea fossil site (more commonly known as the La Brea tar pits) in Los Angeles, California, the Rancholabrean is characterized by the presence of the genus Bison in a Pleistocene context, often in association with other extinct Pleistocene forms such as Mammuthus. The age is usually considered to overlap the late Middle Pleistocene and Late Pleistocene epochs. The Rancholabrean is preceded by the Irvingtonian NALMA stage, and it is succeeded by the Santarosean age.

The Rancholabrean can be further divided into the substages of the Sheridanian: Upper boundary source of the base of the Holocene (approximate) 

By another terminology, it can be split into two sub-intervals, Ra1 from 250,000 to 115,000 years ago, and Ra2 from 115,000 to 12,000 years ago.

On other continents, the Rancholabrean shares this time period with the Oldenburgian of European Land Mammal Ages, and the latter Lujanian of the South American Land Mammal Ages.

References 

 
Pleistocene life
Middle Pleistocene
Late Pleistocene
Pleistocene animals of North America
Pleistocene California
Geology of Los Angeles County, California